Spilostethus is a genus of bugs in the family Lygaeidae (seed bugs). Most species in this genus are from the Palearctic and Oriental regions.

Species
These species belong to the genus Spilostethus:

 Spilostethus altivolens Linnavuori, 1978
 Spilostethus amaenus (Bolivar, 1879)
 Spilostethus campbelli (Distant, 1918)
 Spilostethus consanguineus (Montandon, 1893)
 Spilostethus crudelis Fabricius, 1781
 Spilostethus decoratus (Stål, 1867)
 Spilostethus furcula (Herrich-Schaeffer, 1850)
 Spilostethus hospes (Fabricius, 1794) (darth maul bug)
 Spilostethus lemniscatus (Stål, 1855)
 Spilostethus longiceps Linnavuori, 1978
 Spilostethus longulus (Dallas, 1852)
 Spilostethus macilentus Stål, 1874
 Spilostethus merui Scudder, 1962
 Spilostethus mimus (Stål, 1865)
 Spilostethus montislunae Bergroth, 1914
 Spilostethus nasalis (Gerstaecker, 1873)
 Spilostethus pacificus (Boisduval, 1835)
 Spilostethus pandurus (Scopoli, 1763)type species (as Cimex militaris Fabricius JC = S. pandurus militaris) - Europe
 Spilostethus rivularis (Germar, 1837) (brooklet milkweed bug)
 Spilostethus rubriceps (Horvath, 1899)
 Spilostethus saxatilis (Scopoli, 1763)
 Spilostethus stehliki Deckert, 2013
 Spilostethus taeniatus (Stål, 1865)
 Spilostethus trilineatus (Fabricius, 1794)

References

External links

 Biology of S. furcula with notes on identification
 

Lygaeidae